Gottesman is a surname of Germanic origin meaning man of God. Notable people with the surname include: 

 Beyle Schaechter–Gottesman, Yiddish singer, songwriter, and poet
 Blake Gottesman, personal aide and bodyguard to President George W. Bush
 Daniel Gottesman, physicist, Perimeter Institute 
 David Gottesman, billionaire, director of Berkshire Hathaway
 David Gottesman (politician)
 Dov Gottesman (1917–2011), Israeli art collector, president of the Israel Museum from 2001-11
 Irving Gottesman, psychiatric geneticist
 Joan Gottesman Wexler (born 1946), American Dean and President of Brooklyn Law School
 Michael Gottesman (lawyer), lawyer and law professor at Georgetown University
 Michael M. Gottesman, biochemist, National Institutes of Health
 Moshe Gottesman, rabbi, educator and community leader
 Noam Gottesman (born 1961), founding partner of GLG Partners hedge fund, son of Dov
 Rebecca Gottesman, neurologist and epidemiologist, Johns Hopkins University
 Rubin Gottesman, man found guilty of trafficking in child pornography in United States v. X-Citement Video
 S.D. Gottesman, pen-name of author Cyril M. Kornbluth
 Samuel Gottesman, businessman who brought Central National-Gottesman to prominence
 Sanford Gottesman, president of The Gottesman Company, board member of OPIC, father of Blake
 Susan Gottesman, microbiologist, National Institutes of Health

See also
 18668 Gottesman, asteroid named after David Alexander Gottesman (born 1986)
 Gottesman–Knill theorem, theoretical result in quantum computing (QC) that states that an important subclass of quantum circuits, called stabilizer circuits, can be simulated efficiently
 Central National-Gottesman, pulp and paper marketer

External links 
 Gottesmans on the web
 Gottesman Surname Project

German-language surnames
Jewish surnames